TRT Belgesel (TRT Documentary) is a Turkish television owned and operated by Turkish Radio and Television Corporation. It broadcasts documentaries.

References

External links
TRT Documentary Official Website 

Television stations in Turkey
Turkish-language television stations
Television channels and stations established in 2009
2009 establishments in Turkey
Turkish Radio and Television Corporation